The Atlantic Club Ridge is a ridge rising to 161 m on Hurd Peninsula in Eastern Livingston Island, Antarctica. To the west the ridge surmounts the South Bay coast north of Johnsons Dock, to the south it is bounded by the lower course of the two km long Contell Glacier, to the east by the foot of the Balkan Snowfield sloping up towards Krum Rock and to the northwest by Sea Lion Tarn.  The ridge is snow-free in the summer months.

The ridge's steep northern slopes are linked with Hesperides Hill by a saddle of 52 m elevation. The higher rocky ground on the Atlantic Club Ridge, as well as on the hills surmounting Bulgarian Beach, is noted for its abundant bushy-grown lichens, while moss and Antarctic hair-grass (Deschampsia antarctica) communities thrive on the guano-enriched soil on top of larger rocks at the seaward hill feet.

In commemoration of the co-organizers of the 1993–94, 1994–95, and 1995–96 Bulgarian Antarctic campaigns the name Atlantic Club was originally applied in 1994 to the neighbouring glacier but, due to priority of the existing Spanish name (Glaciar Contell), the name was subsequently transferred to the present feature.

Location

The ridge was mapped in detail by the Spanish Servicio Geográfico del Ejército in 1991.

See also
 List of Bulgarian toponyms in Antarctica
 Antarctic Place-names Commission

Maps
 Isla Livingston: Península Hurd. Mapa topográfico de escala 1:25000. Madrid: Servicio Geográfico del Ejército, 1991. (Map reproduced on p. 16 of the linked work)
 L.L. Ivanov. Livingston Island: Central-Eastern Region. Scale 1:25000 topographic map.  Sofia: Antarctic Place-names Commission of Bulgaria, 1996.
 L.L. Ivanov et al., Antarctica: Livingston Island and Greenwich Island, South Shetland Islands (from English Strait to Morton Strait, with illustrations and ice-cover distribution), 1:100000 scale topographic map, Antarctic Place-names Commission of Bulgaria, Sofia, 2005
 L.L. Ivanov. Antarctica: Livingston Island and Greenwich, Robert, Snow and Smith Islands. Scale 1:120000 topographic map. Troyan: Manfred Wörner Foundation, 2010.  (First edition 2009. )
 Antarctica, South Shetland Islands, Livingston Island: Bulgarian Antarctic Base. Sheets 1 and 2. Scale 1:2000 topographic map. Geodesy, Cartography and Cadastre Agency, 2016. (in Bulgarian)
 Antarctic Digital Database (ADD). Scale 1:250000 topographic map of Antarctica. Scientific Committee on Antarctic Research (SCAR). Since 1993, regularly upgraded and updated.
 L.L. Ivanov. Antarctica: Livingston Island and Smith Island. Scale 1:100000 topographic map. Manfred Wörner Foundation, 2017.

References
 Atlantic Club Ridge. SCAR Composite Gazetteer of Antarctica
 Bulgarian Antarctic Gazetteer. Antarctic Place-names Commission. (details in Bulgarian, basic data in English)

Bibliography 
 J. Stewart. Antarctica: An Encyclopedia. Jefferson, N.C. and London: McFarland, 2011. 1771 pp.

External links
 Atlantic Club Ridge. Copernix satellite image

Ridges of Livingston Island